Chaires (pronounced as ) is an unincorporated community located just east of Tallahassee in Leon County, Florida, United States. It is located near the intersection of Chaires Cross Road and Capitola Road, northeast of Lake Lafayette and the Edwards Wildlife Area.

Chaires is home to the Chaires-Capitola Volunteer Fire Department.

Geography

History

Chaires was named after one of its earliest founders, Green Hill Chaires, one of three brothers who moved to Florida and helped settle Tallahassee and the surrounding areas. Green Hill and his brothers, Benjamin and Thomas Peter Chaires, all created thriving plantations in the southeastern section of Leon County. They settled down, became wealthy planters and were influential, to varying degrees, on the politics of North Florida. Although the plantations are gone, their legacies still exist today in the names, families, pride and history of the area that is now known as Chaires.

Green Hill originally built a cotton plantation on the edge of Lake Lafayette, Florida. There he began to develop into a wealthy and, therefore, influential Southern planter. In 1838, however, an Indian raid left several of his family members, including his wife, dead and his home burned to the ground. To rebuild, Green Hill moved further east. He built a new plantation, called Evergreen Hills, in the area that is currently known as Chaires. It was so named because Green Hill owned all of this land until he gave certain tracts of it to the building of the railroad and his descendants.

The Chaires Massacre occurred in 1839, on a Saturday in July after dark. Interrupted by the attack, the family fled their home. Hannah Averitt Chaires, wife of Green Hill, and two children perished in the attack. Green Hill Chaires sought help from a small force of men in Tallahassee called the "minute men". Although an attempt was made to track the Indians, Capt. Hugh Fisher and his "minute men"' were unable to pursue the trail due to a heavy rainstorm. According to this article, the reason for the attack is unknown. Perhaps it was the eastern location of the Chaires farm, and its distance from Old St. Augustine Road, which was the main thoroughfare at the time. (Florida Clipping Service, Tampa, Florida, Tallahassee Democrat, November, 1946)

Education

Chaires School

Probably one of the greatest historical gems of Chaires is the Chaires School. Chaires became more settled and the land more open, the community of Chaires began to grow. In the Chaires area, Barrow Hill school and Chaires school provided education for the children who lived in eastern Leon County. Actually in the early days of Leon County, children from Tallahassee also attended school in Chaires. Boarding with families in Chaires during the week, and going home on the train for the weekend. Chaires school is now known as Chaires Elementary School home to around 550 students for grades pre-kindergarten to 5th grade. Chaires is also an A+ schools and has been since at least 2000. Chaires is also a place of employment for around 40 teachers. Chaires now sits in its second location since the school house at 4774 Chaires Cross Road, Tallahassee Fl 32317.

Public safety

Fire and rescue services are provided to the community by the Chaires-Capitola VFD.

Places of interest

In the early 2000s, Leon County developed Chaires-Capitola Community Park, a new community park adjacent to Chaires Elementary School. The park has four lighted tennis courts, two basketball courts and two standard Little League Baseball diamonds. The Dorothy Cooper Spence Community Center was also built to serve the citizens of the community and named after Dorothy Cooper Spence, a community activist. The community center and park have become the focal point of the larger Chaires community.

Unknown boundaries or population
Since Chaires is not a formal municipality, but rather a community by association, its boundaries are undefined.  However, with the growing sprawl of the city of Tallahassee, more and more people in unincorporated eastern Leon County often distinguish themselves by associating with the "Chaires" community name.  This sometimes includes neighborhoods south of Apalachee Parkway, along Williams, Louvinia, and WW Kelley Roads.

Political

Residents
Laura Dixie, hospital worker and civil rights organizer in Tallahassee

References

External links
 Chaires-Capitola Volunteer Fire Department

Unincorporated communities in Leon County, Florida
Tallahassee metropolitan area
History of Leon County, Florida
Unincorporated communities in Florida